María Belén Toimil Fernández (born 5 May 1994) is a Spanish athlete specialising in the shot put. She represented her country at the 2017 World Championships without qualifying for the final.

She holds the Spanish shot put records outdoors (18.80 m, Castellón de la Plana, 2021) and indoors (18.64 m, Toruń, 2021).

Personal bests

Outdoor
Shot put: 18.80 m   (Castellón 2021)
Discus throw: 50.42 m (León 2013)
Indoor
Shot put: 18.64 m   (Toruń 2021)

International competitions

References

External links
 
 
 
 

1994 births
Living people
Spanish female shot putters
Olympic athletes of Spain
Athletes (track and field) at the 2020 Summer Olympics
World Athletics Championships athletes for Spain
People from Ferrol (comarca)
Sportspeople from the Province of A Coruña
20th-century Spanish women
21st-century Spanish women